The following outline is provided as an overview of and topical guide to Esperanto:

Esperanto is the most widely spoken constructed international auxiliary language. L. L. Zamenhof, a Polish-Jewish ophthalmologist, created Esperanto in the late 19th century and published the first book detailing it, Unua Libro, in 1887 under the pseudonym Dr. Esperanto, Esperanto translating as "one who hopes".

What type of thing is Esperanto? 

Esperanto can be described as all of the following:

Language
International auxiliary language
Constructed language

Branches of Esperanto 

 Esperantido
 Mundolinco
 Reformed Esperanto (Esperanto 1894)
 Ido
 Esperanto II
 Romániço

History of Esperanto 
 History of Esperanto
Zamenhof
Proto-Esperanto
Unua Libro
Dua Libro
La Esperantisto
Fundamento de Esperanto
Declaration of Boulogne
Montevideo Resolution
Manifesto of Rauma
Manifesto of Prague
Modern evolution of Esperanto

General Esperanto concepts 

Grammar
Phonology
Orthography
Braille
Substitutions and reforms of the Esperanto alphabet
Letters with diacritics
Ĉ
Ĝ
Ĥ
Ĵ
Ŝ
Ŭ
Vocabulary
Etymology
Special Esperanto adverbs
Interrogatives in Esperanto
Esperanto words with the infix -um-
Esperanto profanity
 Comparison between:
Esperanto and Ido
Esperanto and Interlingua
Esperanto and Novial
Gender reform in Esperanto

Esperanto organizations 
List of Esperanto organizations
World Esperanto Congress
Akademio de Esperanto
Universal Esperanto Association
World Esperanto Youth Organization
International Youth Congress
European Youth Week
World Anational Association
Encyclopedia
Pasporta Servo
Plouézec Meetings
European Esperanto Union
Europe–Democracy–Esperanto
Panamerican Congress
Skolta Esperanto Ligo

Presidents of Universal Esperanto Association 

Universal Esperanto Association
President of the Universal Esperanto Association
Louis Bastien (Esperantist)
Probal Dasgupta
Kep Enderby
Mark Fettes
Hector Hodler
Harry W. Holmes
Ivo Lapenna
Ernfrid Malmgren
Harold Bolingbroke Mudie
Edmond Privat
John C. Wells

Additional Esperanto organizations 

Esperanto club
International League of Esperantist Radio Amateurs
Akademio de Esperanto
Akademio Literatura de Esperanto
Arbeidernes Esperantoforbund
Association of Green Esperantists
Bahá'í Esperanto-League
Buenos Aires Esperanto Association
Distributed Language Translation
E@I
Esperantic Studies Foundation
Esperanto Museum and Collection of Planned Languages
Europe–Democracy–Esperanto
European Esperanto Union
Guvernanta Sonorilo Esperanto
Icelandic Esperanto Association
Indigenous Dialogues
Indonesian Esperanto Association
International Esperanto League
International League of Christian Esperantists
International League of Esperanto Teachers
International Union of Catholic Esperantists
Iranian Esperanto Association
Junularo Esperantista Brita
Mondpaca Esperantista Movado
Pasporta Servo
Plouézec International Meetings
President of the Universal Esperanto Association
Quebec Esperanto Society
SATEB
Sennacieca Asocio Tutmonda
Skolta Esperanto Ligo
Terminologia Esperanto-Centro
Universal Esperanto Association
World Esperantist Vegetarian Association
World Esperanto Youth Organization

National Esperanto organizations 

Australian Esperanto Association
Esperanto Association of Britain
Canadian Esperanto Association
Croatian Esperanto League
Esperanto in Malaysia
Iranian Esperanto Association
New Zealand Esperanto Association
Norvega Esperantista Ligo
Taiwan Esperanto Association
Esperanto-USA
Esperanto in Korea

Esperanto meetings 

Conference on the Application of Esperanto in Science and Technology
Esperanto Youth Week
FESTO (Esperanto meeting)
Internacia Junulara Festivalo
Internaciaj Floraj Ludoj
International Youth Congress
Panamerican Esperanto Congress
Semajno de Kulturo Internacia
Summer Esperanto Study
World Esperanto Congress

Esperanto ideas 

Anationalism
Finvenkismo
Raumism

Esperanto publications

Dictionaries
Komputeko
Pekoteko
Plena Ilustrita Vortaro de Esperanto
Plena Manlibro de Esperanta Gramatiko
Plena Vortaro de Esperanto
Reta Vortaro
La Vortaro
Vortaro de Esperanto

Encyclopedias
Encyclopedias in Esperanto
Enciklopedio Kalblanda
Esperanto Wikipedia

Esperanto literature
Esperanto literature
Akademio Literatura de Esperanto
Dua Libro
Floral Games
Fundamento de Esperanto
Ho, mia kor'
The Life of Zamenhof
Proverbaro Esperanta
Saga (comics)
Serio Oriento-Okcidento
The Epic of Utnoa
Two Diseases in Esperanto
Unua Libro
L. L. Zamenhof
Lidia Zamenhof

Esperanto novels
Abismoj
Children of Orpheus
Gerda malaperis!
Kazohinia
Kredu min, sinjorino!
Metro (novel)
Mr. Tot Aĉetas Mil Okulojn
Saltego trans Jarmiloj
Tur-Strato 4
Voyage to Faremido

Esperanto media
Esperanto music
La Espero
List of Esperanto-language films

Esperanto magazines
List of Esperanto periodicals
Amerika Esperantisto
Esperanto (magazine)
Heroldo de Esperanto
Irana Esperantisto
Kontakto
La Esperantisto
La Revuo
Libera Folio
Lingvo Internacia (periodical)
Literatura Foiro
Literatura Mondo
Monato
La Ondo de Esperanto
PACO (magazine)

Historical publications

Bible translations into Esperanto
Der Esperantist
La Esperantisto
Lingvo Internacia (periodical)
Plena Ilustrita Vortaro de Esperanto
Xin Shiji

Persons influential in Esperanto 
Esperanto movement
List of Esperanto speakers
Esperantujo
Native Esperanto speakers

Esperanto education 

International Academy of Sciences San Marino
Bona Espero
International League of Esperanto Teachers
Kurso de Esperanto
Lernu!
North American Summer Esperanto Institute
Propaedeutic value of Esperanto
Summer Esperanto Study
Wedgwood Memorial College

See also

References

External links 
 Omniglot:Esperanto
 What Are The Main Esperanto Magazines?

Esperanto
Esperanto
Esperanto